The Rest Is Silence is a 2007 Romanian film directed by Nae Caranfil. It was Romania's official submission for the 2009 Academy Award for Best Foreign Language Film.

The film had a budget of over two million euros and tells the story of the first feature film in Romanian history.

The film was the most expensive Romanian film to date.

Cast 
  - Grigore 'Grig' Ursache
  - Leon Negrescu
 Mirela Zeta - Emilia
 Mihai Gruia Sandu - Iancu Ursache
  - Catargiu
 Nicu Mihoc - Anton Vorbula
 Gavril Patru - The Cameraman
 Silviu Biris - Raoul
 Vlad Zamfirescu - Nutu Ferefide
 Samuel Tastet - Raymond Duffin
 Florin Zamfirescu - Colonel Guta - Chief of Police
 Alexandru Hasnas - King Carol I
 Ioana Bulcă - Aristizza

References

External links
 

2007 films
Films directed by Nae Caranfil
Romanian comedy-drama films